The Guineas originally called the One Thousand Guineas was a greyhound racing competition held annually. It was inaugurated in 1939 at Park Royal Stadium over 400 yards.

Following the closure of Park Royal in 1969 the race switched to Hendon Greyhound Stadium, however there were only three editions at Hendon because the stadium also closed in 1972. In 1973 Hackney Wick Stadium hosted the event, initially over a sprint distance. Hackney introduced the Lead sponsored by William Hill in 1975; at the same time they switched the 1,000 Guineas to a longer distance of 484 metres.   

In 1994 Perry Barr Stadium introduced an alternative competition also called the Guineas which effectively replaced the Hackney event because it came to an end in 1995 following the financial troubles at Hackney. Two versions were therefore held during 1994 and 1995. The competition continued to have a journeyman life when it switched to Nottingham Greyhound Stadium in 2003 before ending in 2010.

Past winners

Venues and distances
1939-1968 (Park Royal, 400 yards)
1969-1971 (Hendon, 475 yards)
1972-1975 (Hackney, 330 yards)
1976-1995 (Hackney, 484 metres)
1992-2002 (Perry Barr, 480 metres)
2003-2010 (Nottingham, 500 metres)

Sponsors
1983-1983 Mecca
1990-1991 William Hill
1994-1994 AR Dennis
1998-2002 Ladbrokes
2006-2006 Grolsch
2007-2007 Carling
2008-2009 Caffreys

References

Greyhound racing competitions in the United Kingdom
Recurring sporting events established in 1939
Greyhound racing in London